Galbi-tang (--湯) or short rib soup is a variety of guk, or Korean soup, made primarily from beef short ribs along with stewing beef, radish, onions, and other ingredients. The short ribs, or "galbi",also refers to grilled short ribs in Korean barbecue while the suffix tang is another name for guk. Hence, the Korean name literally means "short ribs soup" and is also called garitang, or galitang. The clear and hearty soup is made by slowly simmering galbi in water for a long time and is eaten as a meal. It is similar to seolleongtang, a soup made from the bones of ox legs.

Historical records on galbitang are found in records on table setting for Korean royal court banquets held in the 1890s. However, galbi was assumed to have been eaten since the end of the Goryeo Dynasty (918 – 1392).

Galbitang has been a representative dish served at wedding receptions.

Preparation
About five hours are needed to cook the whole dish. Slits are made in the top of the inner bones with a sharp knife before the ribs are cut to make the flesh separate easily from the prepared beef rib. The ribs are chopped into pieces of  5–6 cm in length, and a whole radish is inserted into a pot with water over a high heat at first. As time goes by, the heat is lowered to a medium temperature. Once the beef becomes soft after being simmered for about four to five hours, the radish is taken out of the pot. It is flatly sliced into a 3 cm length. The ribs are also taken out of the pot and seasoned with minced scallions, garlic, and pepper powder, sesame oil, a mixture of sesame and salt, and soy sauce. As the soup is chilled, fat floating on the surface is removed. The seasoned ribs and sliced radish are again put into the pot and are simmered one more time.

See also
 Samgyetang, a chicken ginseng soup
 Seolleongtang, a beef soup
 Haejangguk, soups eaten as a hangover remedy
 List of soups
 Korean cuisine
 List of Korean dishes
 Irish stew

References

External links

Galbitang recipe, Konglish Kitchen

Korean soups and stews